The Plateau de Bure Interferometer (PdBI) was a six-antenna interferometer on the Pic de Bure (2550 m) in the French Alps, operated by the Institut de radioastronomie millimétrique. In 2014, it has been replaced by the Northern Extended Millimeter Array. It was specifically designed for millimetre-wave observations and specialises in studies of line emission from molecular gas and radio continuum of cold dust.

The interferometer consisted of six antennas with a diameter of 15 m each.  These antennas could be placed in a T-shaped pattern, with north–south track of 368 m and an east–west track of 768 m. There were 32 stations along these tracks where the antennas can be positioned. Observing bands are at 3, 2, 1.8 and 0.8 mm.
At an observing wavelength of 3 mm (100 GHz frequency) each of these telescopes could resolve two objects 45 arcseconds apart from each other on the sky. In an interferometer, these 45″ are actually the size of the field of view. So an interferometer like this one images, at very high resolution (better than 1″), structures smaller than 45″.

Aerial tramway
The observatory was serviced by an aerial tramway.

1999 accident

On 1 July 1999, an aerial tramway car fell  to the valley floor.  All 20 occupants were killed, in one of the worst cable car accidents in recorded history.  The majority were employees and contractors of the observatory.

See also
 List of radio telescopes
 List of astronomical observatories
 CARMA another millimetre-wave array operated by a consortium including Caltech, University of California Berkeley, University of Illinois, University of Maryland and University of Chicago.
 Atacama Large Millimeter Array, a large (sub)millimetre-wave array.
 Northern Extended Millimeter Array

References

Radio telescopes
Interferometric telescopes
Hautes-Alpes
Astronomical observatories in France